Sašo Miloševski (Macedonian Cyrillic: Сашо Милошевски; born 27 April 1968) is a retired Macedonian international football player. He used to play as a midfielder.

Club career 
After playing in the main Macedonian clubs, FK Vardar and FK Pelister, in 1995 he signed for the Serbian side FK Vojvodina, where he had an important role and get to be the captain of the team. After impressive three seasons, he was one of the few Macedonian footballers to emigrate to Mexico and play in Veracruz. After one season he was back to FK Rabotnički where he finished his playing career.

National team 
He played in the first ever official match of Macedonia, played on 13 October 1993, against Slovenia. Ever since, Sašo Miloševski played 10 matches scoring once for the Macedonian national team between 1993 and 1998. His final international was an August 1997 FIFA World Cup qualification match against Romania.

Honours 
 FK Vardar
3 times Macedonian First Football League Champion: 1992–93, 1993–94 and 1994–95
2 times Macedonian Football Cup winner: 1993 and 1995

References

External links 
 

1968 births
Living people
Sportspeople from Bitola
Association football midfielders
Yugoslav footballers
Macedonian footballers
North Macedonia international footballers
FK Vardar players
FK Pelister players
FK Vojvodina players
C.D. Veracruz footballers
FK Rabotnički players
Yugoslav First League players
Yugoslav Second League players
Macedonian First Football League players
First League of Serbia and Montenegro players
Liga MX players
Macedonian expatriate footballers
Expatriate footballers in Serbia and Montenegro
Macedonian expatriate sportspeople in Serbia and Montenegro
Expatriate footballers in Mexico